TIM Brasil Serviços e Participações S.A., commonly known as TIM Brasil, is a Brazilian telecommunications company, subsidiary of Telecom Italia Finance S.A., which provides mobile and fixed telephony services.

TIM Brasil was founded as a company in 1995, started commercial operations in 1998 and since 2002 has consolidated its national presence, becoming the first mobile phone operator present in all Brazilian States and, as of April 2017, has over 61.3 million customers.

The Company, through the GSM technology, has a national reach of approximately 93% of urban population and offers services to mobile and fixed telephony, data transmission and Internet access at high speed, bringing the convergence of services for all its customers in a single company.

TIM Brasil is headquartered in Rio de Janeiro and is listed in BM&F Bovespa and NYSE, in São Paulo and New York City, respectively.

On May 5, 2012, TIM's chairman Luca Luciani resigned from all of his duties at TIM both in Brazil and Italy. There were charges concerning scams about the activation of SIM cards for deceased and non-existing persons.

Products and services
TIM Live is a broadband Internet service provided in some areas of São Paulo and Rio de Janeiro, which uses the VDSL2 technology, currently in two speeds: 35 Mbit/s down (20 Mbit/s up) and 50 Mbit/s down (30 Mbit/s up).

TIM has announced investments up to R$ 100 million/year, within the R$ 3 billion available from the group investment plan. The acquisition from the AES Atimus network in the amount of R$ 1.5 billion allowed a great deal of this operation to be possible. The company is still studying the possibility of expanding this service to other cities.

National fraud in Brazilian prepaid mobile lines
On 8 August 2012, TIM Brasil became involved in a massive scandal after the release of a report by the Brazilian National Telecommunications Agency (Anatel).

The report points out that on TIM's prepaid voice plan (24.7% market share), called "Infinity" (in which the user pays roughly US$0.12 for each unlimited time call), calls were intentionally dropped by the company which forced customers to make (and pay for) new calls to continue talking. In just one day, 8.1 million calls were dropped and the total profit was approximately US$2 million.

Upon release of the report, the Public Ministry of the Paraná State filed a lawsuit against TIM asking that it stop selling new mobile lines in Brazil and pay a multimillion-dollar fine for the damages against consumers.

See also
 List of internet service providers in Brazil
 Telecom Italia
 Telecom Italia Mobile

References

External links
 

Telecom Italia
Companies listed on the New York Stock Exchange
Telecommunications companies of Brazil
Telecommunications companies established in 1995
Companies based in Rio de Janeiro (city)
Mobile phone companies of Brazil
Internet service providers of Brazil
Companies listed on B3 (stock exchange)
Brazilian subsidiaries of foreign companies